The Bumps River is an inlet on Cape Cod, Massachusetts. It separates Osterville from 
Centerville.

References

Rivers of Barnstable County, Massachusetts
Rivers of Massachusetts